Sheffield Winter Garden is a large temperate glasshouse located in the city of Sheffield in South Yorkshire. It is one of the largest temperate glasshouses to be built in the UK during the last hundred years, and the largest urban glasshouse anywhere in Europe. It is home to more than 2,000 plants from all around the world. It was officially opened by Queen Elizabeth II on 22 May 2003.

Design and construction

The building has background frost protection to a minimum of 4 degrees Celsius and it is one of the largest Glued Laminated Timber or "Glulam" buildings in the UK (Glulam is made by forming and gluing strips of timber into specific shapes). The wood used is Larch, a durable timber which will, over time, turn a light silvery grey colour. The larch, derived from sustainable forests, requires no preservatives or coatings. This reduces the use of solvents and also avoids the use of chemicals that could harm the plants. It has an intelligent Building Management System which controls fans and vents to make sure the plants are cooled in summer and kept warm in winter. The system will "learn" year by year.

The bedding plants are changed five times a year, to give a seasonal change, and all the plants are watered by hose or by watering can, as it is the only way to ensure that all the plants get the correct amount of water.

Project team

Clients: Sheffield City Council
Architects: Pringle Richards Sharratt Architects
Project Management: Sheffield City Council
Quantity Surveyors: Sheffield City Council
Structural & Services Engineers: Buro Happold
Fire and Access Consultants: Buro Happold FEDRA
Lighting Consultants: Bartenbach LichtLabor/ Lichttechnik Martin Klingler
Winter Garden Landscape Consultant: Weddle Landscape Design
Planning Supervisor: Sheffield City Council
Management Contractor: Interserve Project Services Ltd
Plant supply, planting and aftercare: Rentokil Tropical Plants Ltd

Partners

The Winter Garden was funded by the Millennium Commission, Sheffield City Council and English Partnerships.

Awards won
 RICS (Royal Institution of Chartered Surveyors) Pro Yorkshire Award for Design & Innovation
 RIBA (Royal Institute of British Architects) Award [with the Millennium Galleries].
 European Federation of Interior Landscaping Groups – three gold awards
 The Variety Club of Great Britain – Best Regeneration Award
 Royal Fine Art Commission 'Jeu D’esprit Building of the Year' Award
 British Guild of Travel Writers – Commendation
 Civic Trust Green Flag Award
 Also instrumental in Sheffield's win in the European entente florale award 2005

References

External links
 Winter Garden pages on Sheffield City Council's website
 Weddle Landscape Design – Landscape Architects and Horticulturalists for Sheffield Winter Garden
 

W
W
Buildings and structures completed in 2003
W
Greenhouses in the United Kingdom
Gardens in South Yorkshire